Carried to Dust is the sixth studio album from Tucson, Arizona indie rock/Americana band Calexico, released September 9, 2008. It features a number of guest musicians like Iron & Wine, Tortoise's Doug McCombs, Pieta Brown, and Amparo Sanchez.

Following the release of Carried to Dust, the band toured throughout the United States, the British Isles and Western Europe.

In 2012 it was awarded a gold certification from the Independent Music Companies Association, which indicated sales of at least 75,000 copies throughout Europe. As of 2009 it has sold 26,000 copies in US.

Track listing 

Written by Joey Burns (1-6,8-15), John Convertino (3-6,10,11,13,15), John Burns (2,3,6,14), Jairo Zavala (1), Jacob Valenzuela (7).

Personnel
 Joey Burns – vocals, guitars, bass, cello, keyboards, accordion, percussion, vibraphone
 John Convertino – drums, percussion, piano
 Paul Niehaus – steel guitar, guitars
 Jacob Valenzuela – trumpet, keyboards, vibraphone, vocals
 Martin Wenk – trumpet, guitar, keyboards, accordion, glockenspiel, vibraphone (occasionally harmonica & French horn)
 Volker Zander – standup bass, electric bass

Charts

References

External links
 

2008 albums
Calexico (band) albums
Quarterstick Records albums